In geometry, a trapezoid in American and Canadian English, or trapezium in British and other forms of English, is a quadrilateral where it has at least one pair of parallel sides.

A trapezoid is necessarily a convex quadrilateral in Euclidean geometry. The parallel sides are called the bases of the trapezoid. The other two sides are called the legs (or the lateral sides) if they are not parallel; otherwise, the trapezoid is a parallelogram, and there are two pairs of bases. A scalene trapezoid is a trapezoid with no sides of equal measure, in contrast with the special cases below.

Etymology and trapezium versus trapezoid

Ancient Greek mathematician Euclid defined five types of quadrilateral, of which four had two sets of parallel sides (known in English as square, rectangle, rhombus and rhomboid) and the last did not have two sets of parallel sides – a τραπέζια (trapezia literally "a table", itself from τετράς (tetrás), "four" + πέζα (péza), "a foot; end, border, edge").

Two types of trapezia were introduced by Proclus (412 to 485 AD) in his commentary on the first book of Euclid's Elements:
 one pair of parallel sides – a trapezium (τραπέζιον), divided into isosceles (equal legs) and scalene (unequal) trapezia
 no parallel sides – trapezoid (τραπεζοειδή, trapezoeidé, literally trapezium-like (εἶδος means "resembles"), in the same way as cuboid means cube-like and rhomboid means rhombus-like)

All European languages follow Proclus's structure as did English until the late 18th century, until an influential mathematical dictionary published by Charles Hutton in 1795 supported without explanation a transposition of the terms. This mistake was corrected in British English in about 1875, but was retained in American English into the modern day.

The following is a table comparing usages, with the most specific definitions at the top to the most general at the bottom.

Inclusive versus exclusive definition
There is some disagreement whether parallelograms, which have two pairs of parallel sides, should be regarded as trapezoids. Some define a trapezoid as a quadrilateral having only one pair of parallel sides (the exclusive definition), thereby excluding parallelograms. Others define a trapezoid as a quadrilateral with at least one pair of parallel sides (the inclusive definition), making the parallelogram a special type of trapezoid. The latter definition is consistent with its uses in higher mathematics such as calculus. This article uses the inclusive definition and considers parallelograms as special cases of a trapezoid. This is also advocated in the taxonomy of quadrilaterals.

Under the inclusive definition, all parallelograms (including rhombuses, squares and non-square rectangles) are trapezoids. Rectangles have mirror symmetry on mid-edges; rhombuses have mirror symmetry on vertices, while squares have mirror symmetry on both mid-edges and vertices.

Special cases

A right trapezoid (also called right-angled trapezoid) has two adjacent right angles. Right trapezoids are used in the trapezoidal rule for estimating areas under a curve.

An acute trapezoid has two adjacent acute angles on its longer base edge, while an obtuse trapezoid has one acute and one obtuse angle on each base.

An isosceles trapezoid is a trapezoid where the base angles have the same measure. As a consequence the two legs are also of equal length and it has reflection symmetry. This is possible for acute trapezoids or right trapezoids (rectangles).

A parallelogram is a trapezoid with two pairs of parallel sides. A parallelogram has central 2-fold rotational symmetry (or point reflection symmetry). It is possible for obtuse trapezoids or right trapezoids (rectangles).

A tangential trapezoid is a trapezoid that has an incircle.

A Saccheri quadrilateral is similar to a trapezoid in the hyperbolic plane, with two adjacent right angles, while it is a rectangle in the Euclidean plane. A Lambert quadrilateral in the hyperbolic plane has 3 right angles.

Condition of existence
Four lengths a, c, b, d can constitute the consecutive sides of a non-parallelogram trapezoid with a and b parallel only when

The quadrilateral is a parallelogram when , but it is an ex-tangential quadrilateral (which is not a trapezoid) when .

Characterizations

Given a convex quadrilateral, the following properties are equivalent, and each implies that the quadrilateral is a trapezoid:
It has two adjacent angles that are supplementary, that is, they add up to 180 degrees.
The angle between a side and a diagonal is equal to the angle between the opposite side and the same diagonal.
The diagonals cut each other in mutually the same ratio (this ratio is the same as that between the lengths of the parallel sides).
The diagonals cut the quadrilateral into four triangles of which one opposite pair have equal areas.
The product of the areas of the two triangles formed by one diagonal equals the product of the areas of the two triangles formed by the other diagonal.
The areas S and T of some two opposite triangles of the four triangles formed by the diagonals satisfy the equation

where K is the area of the quadrilateral.

The midpoints of two opposite sides and the intersection of the diagonals are collinear.
The angles in the quadrilateral ABCD satisfy 
The cosines of two adjacent angles sum to 0, as do the cosines of the other two angles.
The cotangents of two adjacent angles sum to 0, as do the cotangents of the other two adjacent angles.
One bimedian divides the quadrilateral into two quadrilaterals of equal areas.
Twice the length of the bimedian connecting the midpoints of two opposite sides equals the sum of the lengths of the other sides.

Additionally, the following properties are equivalent, and each implies that opposite sides a and b are parallel:
 The consecutive sides a, c, b, d and the diagonals p, q satisfy the equation

The distance v between the midpoints of the diagonals satisfies the equation

Midsegment and height
The midsegment (also called the median or midline) of a trapezoid is the segment that joins the midpoints of the legs. It is parallel to the bases. Its length m is equal to the average of the lengths of the bases a and b of the trapezoid,

The midsegment of a trapezoid is one of the two bimedians (the other bimedian divides the trapezoid into equal areas).

The height (or altitude) is the perpendicular distance between the bases. In the case that the two bases have different lengths (a ≠ b), the height of a trapezoid h can be determined by the length of its four sides using the formula

where c and d are the lengths of the legs.

Area
The area K of a trapezoid is given by

where a and b are the lengths of the parallel sides, h is the height (the perpendicular distance between these sides), and m is the arithmetic mean of the lengths of the two parallel sides. In 499 AD Aryabhata, a great mathematician-astronomer from the classical age of Indian mathematics and Indian astronomy, used this method in the Aryabhatiya (section 2.8). This yields as a special case the well-known formula for the area of a triangle, by considering a triangle as a degenerate trapezoid in which one of the parallel sides has shrunk to a point.

The 7th-century Indian mathematician Bhāskara I derived the following formula for the area of a trapezoid with consecutive sides a, c, b, d:

where a and b are parallel and b > a. This formula can be factored into a more symmetric version

When one of the parallel sides has shrunk to a point (say a = 0), this formula reduces to Heron's formula for the area of a triangle.

Another equivalent formula for the area, which more closely resembles Heron's formula, is

where  is the semiperimeter of the trapezoid. (This formula is similar to Brahmagupta's formula, but it differs from it, in that a trapezoid might not be cyclic (inscribed in a circle). The formula is also a special case of Bretschneider's formula for a general quadrilateral).

From Bretschneider's formula, it follows that

The line that joins the midpoints of the parallel sides, bisects the area.

Diagonals

The lengths of the diagonals are

where a is the short base, b is the long base, and c and d are the trapezoid legs.

The ratio of the areas of each pair of adjacent triangles is the same as that between the lengths of the parallel sides.

Let the trapezoid have vertices A, B, C, and D in sequence and have parallel sides AB and DC. Let E be the intersection of the diagonals, and let F be on side DA and G be on side BC such that FEG is parallel to AB and CD. Then FG is the harmonic mean of AB and DC:

The line that goes through both the intersection point of the extended nonparallel sides and the intersection point of the diagonals, bisects each base.

Other properties
The center of area (center of mass for a uniform lamina) lies along the line segment joining the midpoints of the parallel sides, at a perpendicular distance x from the longer side b given by

The center of area divides this segment in the ratio (when taken from the short to the long side)

If the angle bisectors to angles A and B intersect at P, and the angle bisectors to angles C and D intersect at Q, then

Applications

Architecture
In architecture the word is used to refer to symmetrical doors, windows, and buildings built wider at the base, tapering toward the top, in Egyptian style. If these have straight sides and sharp angular corners, their shapes are usually isosceles trapezoids. This was the standard style for the doors and windows of the Inca.

Geometry
The crossed ladders problem is the problem of finding the distance between the parallel sides of a right trapezoid, given the diagonal lengths and the distance from the perpendicular leg to the diagonal intersection.

Biology

In morphology, taxonomy and other descriptive disciplines in which a term for such shapes is necessary, terms such as trapezoidal or trapeziform commonly are useful in descriptions of particular organs or forms.

Computer engineering
In computer engineering, specifically digital logic and computer architecture, trapezoids are typically utilized to symbolize multiplexors. Multiplexors are logic elements that select between multiple elements and produce a single output based on a select signal. Typical designs will employ trapezoids without specifically stating they are multiplexors as they are universally equivalent.

See also
 Frustum, a solid having trapezoidal faces
 Polite number, also known as a trapezoidal number
 Wedge, a polyhedron defined by two triangles and three trapezoid faces.

References

Further reading
D. Fraivert, A. Sigler and M. Stupel : Common properties of trapezoids and convex quadrilaterals

External links
 "Trapezium" at Encyclopedia of Mathematics
 
 Trapezoid definition   Area of a trapezoid   Median of a trapezoid With interactive animations
 Trapezoid (North America) at elsy.at: Animated course (construction, circumference, area)
 Trapezoidal Rule on Numerical Methods for Stem Undergraduate
 Autar Kaw and E. Eric Kalu, Numerical Methods with Applications, (2008)

Elementary shapes
Types of quadrilaterals